John Charles Fremont Slayton (June 27, 1856 – January 4, 1922) was an American produce dealer and politician who served as a member of the Melrose, Massachusetts Board of Aldermen, and on the Massachusetts Executive Council.

Early life
Slayton was born in Calais, Vermont on June 27, 1856. His family moved to Morrisville, Vermont, when he was 7 years old.  Slayton was educated in the public schools there, graduating from Morrisville High School. After he graduated from high school, Slayton worked for his father. When he was 35, Slayton moved to Boston.

Family
Slayton had two children Ralph Slayton and Louise (Slayton) Sheldon.

Business career
When he was 35, Slayton moved to Boston and went to work in a produce company. Slayton worked for the firm A. & O. W. Mead. Later on in 1887 Slayton established the firm of Slayton & Boynton, Commission agents in Boston's Haymarket Square.

Death
Slayton died on January 4, 1922.

References

1859 births
American grocers
Businesspeople from Massachusetts
Massachusetts Republicans
Massachusetts city council members
Members of the Massachusetts Governor's Council
People from Melrose, Massachusetts
1922 deaths